Baptie is a surname. Notable people with the surname include:

Crawford Baptie (born 1959), Scottish footballer
Norval Baptie (1879–1966), Canadian speed skater
Trisha Baptie (born 1974), Canadian anti-prostitution activist
J.V.   Baptie (born 1992), Author
Crawford Macandrew (born 1985), Scottish explorer. Otherwise known as Baptie.